Jakob Gimpel (April 16, 1906March 12, 1989) was a Polish concert pianist and educator.

Jakob Gimpel was born in Lwów (then in Polish Galicia, part of the Austria-Hungarian Empire, and now Lviv, Ukraine). Gimpel's younger brother, Bronislav Gimpel, was a noted concert violinist, and his older brother, Karol Gimpel, was a pianist and conductor.

Performing career
Gimpel began his piano studies with his father, Adolph, and later studied piano with Cornelia Tarnowska and Eduard Steuermann, and music theory with Alban Berg. Gimpel made his debut in Vienna, Austria, in 1923, with the Concertgebouw Orchestra, conducted by Pierre Monteux. He played Rachmaninoff's 2nd Piano Concerto.

Gimpel toured with violinists Bronisław Huberman, Erika Morini, Nathan Milstein, and his brother, Bronislav Gimpel. In 1937, Gimpel helped Huberman found the Palestine Symphony Orchestra, now the Israel Philharmonic Orchestra. Gimpel migrated to New York City in 1938 and later moved to Los Angeles.

Film credits
Among Gimpel's film credits are recorded appearances in Gaslight, Possessed, Letter from an Unknown Woman, Strange Fascination, The Story of Three Loves, Planet of the Apes and The Mephisto Waltz. Gimpel also recorded music for two classic cartoons: Rhapsody Rabbit and the Academy-Award-winning Tom and Jerry short Johann Mouse.

Later years and honors
Gimpel was one of the first European-American artists to return to Europe after World War II; he played hundreds of concerts in West Germany in 1954. From 1971 to 1986, Gimpel was professor in residence at California State University, Northridge (CSUN). He was awarded the West German Order of Merit, First Class, and, in 1975, the Ben-Gurion Award from the State of Israel.

On May 9, 1979, Gimpel was scheduled to give a joint recital in Los Angeles with his brother Bronislav Gimpel. Bronislav died unexpectedly several days before the performance and Jakob played a solo recital in memory of his brother.

Filmography

References

External links
 

1906 births
1989 deaths
Musicians from Lviv
Polish music educators
Jews from Galicia (Eastern Europe)
Officers Crosses of the Order of Merit of the Federal Republic of Germany
Polish classical pianists
Male classical pianists
20th-century classical pianists
Jewish classical pianists
20th-century male musicians
Jewish emigrants from Nazi Germany to the United States